The Jacob Sears Library is the public library of Dennis, Massachusetts.  It is located at 23 Center Street in East Dennis, in a building funded by a bequest from Jacob Sears, a longtime East Dennis resident.  The Shingle style structure was built in 1895 to a design by the Boston firm of Rand & Taylor.  The library building was listed on the National Register of Historic Places in 2009.

Architecture and history
The Jacob Sears Memorial Library is set on the south side of Center Street in the village of East Dennis, just north of Massachusetts Route 6A.  It is a rectangular single-story wood frame structure, with a hip roof and a stone foundation.  The ridge line of the roof is T shaped, with the section at the right end perpendicular to the street.  This section extends to shelter the main entrance, flaring out form a portico supported by square posts and large brackets.  Just to the right of the entrance is a turreted polygonal projection.  Wall dormers line the front facade to the left of the entrance.  The interior is divided into the primary library space at the western end, a large meeting space in the center, with backstage spaces at the far eastern end.

The first library services were provided in East Dennis by a private lending association founded in 1866.  Jacob Sears, a lifelong resident of East Dennis, gave funding for the construction and endowment of this library building, which was completed in 1895 to a design by the Boston firm of Rand & Taylor.  The meeting hall has been used for a wide variety of civic and social functions.  The building underwent a major restoration in 2005-06.

See also
National Register of Historic Places listings in Barnstable County, Massachusetts

References

External links
 Jacob Sears Library website

Library buildings completed in 1896
National Register of Historic Places in Barnstable County, Massachusetts
Shingle Style architecture in Massachusetts
Libraries in Barnstable County, Massachusetts
Public libraries in Massachusetts
1896 establishments in Massachusetts
Dennis, Massachusetts
Historic districts on the National Register of Historic Places in Massachusetts